is a town located in Okhotsk Subprefecture, Hokkaido, Japan. The name is derived from the Ainu word piporo, meaning "place of much water".

Largely agricultural, the town is best known for the Bihoro Pass, which has views over Lake Kussharo in the Akan National Park.

One of its attractions is Bihoro Aviation Park, which contains a number of aircraft previously used by the Japan Self-Defense Forces.

As of September 2016, the town has an estimated population of 20,920, and a population density of 48 persons per km2. The total area is 438.36 km2.

History
1915: Bihoro Village founded.
1919: Tsubetsu Village (津別村), now Tsubetsu Town, split.
1921: Part of Tsubetsu Village incorporated.
1923: Bihoro Village becomes Bihoro Town.
1946: Part of Memanbetsu Village (now Memanbetsu Town) incorporated.
1953: Bihoro song, Toru Takemitsu.

Climate

Mascot

He is a gentle and shy black bull. He always sticks his tongue out whenever anyone praises him. His left biceps is shaped like the Bihoro Pass. He wears a sports scarf. This scarf (which resembled a river) contains energy to power his left biceps to give strength to lift or push stuff or to give an extra punch to his enemies. Without it, he will be weak. He eats vegetables to keep his biceps in shape. He likes taking walks but does not like hunting. His birthday is July 19.

References

External links

 
 Official Website 

Towns in Hokkaido